Shrapnel Records is an American record label founded in 1980 by record producer Mike Varney.

History 
Guitarist Marty Friedman (formerly of Megadeth and Cacophony), one of the label's most successful artists, first appeared on the album Unsung Guitar Heroes II in 1980 with the band Vixen. Vixen would later change their name to Hawaii and release the album One Nation Underground for Shrapnel. In 1981, a friend gave Mike Varney a tape featuring a 17-year-old Swedish guitarist named Yngwie Malmsteen. A year later, Malmsteen wrote to the label stating that he wanted to export his music to America. Varney, who started writing a column called "Spotlight" for Guitar Player magazine in 1982, featured Malmsteen in his February 1983 column. The record executive flew Yngwie to California and set him up with vocalist Ron Keel's new band called Steeler. Steeler's self-titled album became a best selling release for Shrapnel Records.

The label was acquired by The Orchard, subsidiary of Sony Music Entertainment, in November 2015.

Related labels 
In 1989, Mike Varney co-founded progressive rock/metal label Magna Carta Records. In the 1990s, he also started the Tone Center Records and Blues Bureau International sublabels to promote fusion and blues.

Notable releases

References

External links 
 Official website

American record labels
Record labels established in 1980
Sony Music
Heavy metal record labels